Bukan is a city in West Azerbaijan Province, Iran.

Bukan may also refer to:

Bukan County, West Azerbaijan Province, Iran
Bukan (electoral district), an Iranian parliamentary electoral district in West Azerbaijan Province
Bukan, Qazvin, a village in Qazvin Province, Iran